Rineloricaria osvaldoi is a species of catfish in the family Loricariidae. It is native to South America, where it occurs in the drainage basin of the Vermelho River, which is itself a tributary of the Araguaia River, in Brazil. The species reaches 16.8 cm (6.6 inches) in standard length and is believed to be a facultative air-breather.

References 

Loricariini
Fish described in 2008
Catfish of South America
Freshwater fish of Brazil